Cigarette Girl is a 1947 American musical comedy film directed by Gunther von Fritsch to a story by Edward Huebsch and screenplay by Henry K. Moritz. The film stars Leslie Brooks, Jimmy Lloyd, Joan Barton, and Ludwig Donath. Music was provided by Russ Morgan and his orchestra. The film was described as "a revamping of the Cinderella theme". Shooting was scheduled to begin on September 9, 1946.

Reception 
The film was first released on February 6, 1947, at Loew's as a second feature to Dead Reckoning which starred Humphrey Bogart. Reception of the film was lackluster, with Wanda Hale of the Daily News giving it two stars and describing it as "a sentimental, indifferent comedy".

Cast
 Leslie Brooks as Ellen Wilcox
 Jimmy Lloyd as Joe Atkins
 Ludwig Donath as Otto
 Doris Colleen as Peggy
 Howard Freeman as  B. J. Halstead
 Joan Barton as Glenda Page
 Mary Forbes as Mrs. Halstead
 Francis Pierlot as Pervis
 Eugene Borden as Henri
 Arthur Loft as Harry Branum
 Russ Morgan as 	Orchestra Leader

References

External links
 

1947 films
Films set in Manhattan
1947 musical comedy films
American musical comedy films
American black-and-white films
Films directed by Gunther von Fritsch
1940s American films